France Bonsant (born August 18, 1952 in Waterville, Quebec) is a Canadian politician.

Bonsant was a Bloc Québécois member of the House of Commons of Canada. She represented the district of Compton—Stanstead from 2004 to 2011. From 1991 to 1999 she was a regional councillor in Le Haut-Saint-François Regional County Municipality representing the municipality of Ascot Corner.

Electoral record

References

External links
 
 How'd They Vote?: France Bonsant's voting history and quotes

1952 births
Bloc Québécois MPs
Women members of the House of Commons of Canada
French Quebecers
Living people
Members of the House of Commons of Canada from Quebec
People from Estrie
Women in Quebec politics
21st-century Canadian politicians
21st-century Canadian women politicians